Harvin is a surname. Notable people with the surname include:

Alex Harvin (1950–2005), American attorney and politician 
Allen Harvin (born 1959), American football player
Cathy Harvin (1953–2010), American politician
Earl Harvin, American drummer, percussionist and multi-instrumentalist
Percy Harvin (born 1988), American football player
Pressley Harvin III (born 1998), American football player